Robert Robinson (c.1811 – 14 May 1852) was a hotel-keeper and politician in colonial Victoria (Australia).

Robinson was licensee of  Commercial Hotel, Corio, from 1841. 
Mercer was elected  to the district of Geelong in the inaugural Victorian Legislative Council in  October 1851.

Robinson died on 14 May 1852, he was married to Elizabeth Mary, who survived him.

References 

 

1811 births
1852 deaths
Members of the Victorian Legislative Council
Burials in Victoria (Australia)
19th-century Australian politicians